This article contains information about the literary events and publications of 1756.

Events
March 1 – The first issue of The Critical Review is published, with Tobias Smollett as editor.
April–May – Beginning of the Seven Years' War in Europe.
June 20 – The Black Hole of Calcutta incident inspires renewed British efforts in India.
October 29 – Frances Abington first acts with the company of the Theatre Royal, Drury Lane, London.
November – Gilbert White becomes curate at his birthplace of Selborne in Hampshire, England, for the second time.
December 14 – Rev. John Home's blank verse tragedy Douglas is performed for the first time, in Edinburgh, with considerable success, in spite of the opposition of the local church presbytery, who summon Rev. Alexander Carlyle to answer for having attended its representation. However, it fails in its early promise to set up a new Scottish dramatic tradition.

New books

Fiction
Anonymous – The Life and Memoirs of Mr. Ephraim Tristram Bates
Thomas Amory – Life of John Buncle
Jeanne-Marie Leprince de Beaumont – "La Belle et la Bête" ("Beauty and the Beast", abridged version, in Magasin des enfants, ou dialogues entre une sage gouvernante et plusieurs de ses élèves)
Charlotte Lennox – The Memoirs of the Countess of Berci
Samuel Richardson (anonymously) – The Paths of Virtue Delineated, children's versions of Pamela, Clarissa, and Sir Charles Grandison

Poetry

Isaac Bickerstaffe – Leucothoe
Richard Owen Cambridge – An Elegy Written in an Empty Assembly Room (parody of Pope's Eloisa to Abelard)
Thomas Cole – The Arbour
William Kenrick – Epistles to Lorenzo
William Mason – Odes
Christopher Pitt – Poems
Christopher Smart
Hymn to the Supreme Being
The Works of Horace

Drama
Frances Brooke – Virginia
John Brown – Athelstane
Samuel Foote
The Englishman Return'd from Paris
The Green-Room Squabble or a Battle Royal between the Queen of Babylon and the Daughter of Darius
David Garrick 
Catherine and Petruchio
The Tempest (opera)
Carlo Goldoni – Il campiello
John Home – Douglas

Non-fiction
Corporate authorship – The Literary Magazine (periodical to 1758)
Thomas Birch – The History of the Royal Society of London vol. i
William Blackstone – An Analysis of the Laws of England
Edmund Burke – A Vindication of Natural Society
Alban Butler – The Lives of the Fathers, Martyrs, and Other Principal Saints (frequently abridged and reprinted)
Theophilus Cibber – Dissertations on Theatrical Subjects
Daniel Fenning – The Universal Spelling Book, or, A New and Easy Guide to the English Language
José Francisco de Isla – Triunfo del amor y de la lealtad o Día Grande de Navarra
Johann Matthias Gesner – Primæ lineæ isagoges in eruditionem universalem
James Grieve – translation of A. Cornelius Celsus of Medicine
Eliza Haywood
as "Mira" – The Wife
posthumously – The Husband: in Answer to The Wife
David Hume – The History of Great Britain vol. ii
Leopold Mozart – Versuch einer gründlichen Violinschule
Alexander Russell – The Natural History of Aleppo
Tobias Smollett 
A Compendium of Authentic and Entertaining Voyages
(et al.) The Critical Review (periodical to 1790)
Voltaire – Essai sur les mœurs et l'esprit des nations
Joseph Warton – An Essay on the Writings and Genius of Pope
John Wesley – An Address to the Clergy

Births
March 3 – William Godwin, English writer (died 1836)
April – William Gifford, English satirist (died 1826)
June 13 – Edmund Lodge, English biographer and writer on heraldry (died 1839)
July 13 – Thomas Rowlandson, English caricaturist (died 1827)
July 25 (probable year) – Elizabeth Hamilton, Irish-born Scottish essayist, poet and novelist (died 1816)
September 15 – Karl Philipp Moritz (C. P. Moritz), German essayist and travel writer (died 1793)
November 2 – Pierre Laromiguière, French philosopher (died 1837)
November 18 – Thomas Burgess, English philosopher and bishop (died 1837)

Deaths
February 25 – Eliza Haywood, English writer and actress (born 1693)
March 26 – Gilbert West, English poet (born 1703)
March 30 to April 2 – Stephen Duck, English poet (suicide, born c. 1705)
June 4 – Benjamin Elbel, German theologian (born 1690)
December 29 – Thomas Cooke, English translator, dramatist and critic (born 1703)

References

 
Years of the 18th century in literature